Pelym is an urban locality (a work settlement) under the administrative jurisdiction of the Town of Ivdel in Sverdlovsk Oblast, Russia. Population:  

Pelym was established in 1962 as a logging town. It takes its name from a much older settlement, Pelym, Garinsky District, Sverdlovsk Oblast, which goes back to the 16th century and used to be prominent as a place of exile. A Gazprom office and an airport are located in Pelym.

Within the framework of the administrative divisions, Pelym and thirty-seven rural localities are subordinated to the Town of Ivdel—an administrative unit with the status equal to that of the districts. As a municipal division, Pelym, together with four rural localities under the administrative jurisdiction of the Town of Ivdel, is incorporated separately as Pelym Urban Okrug. Ivdel and the other thirty-three rural localities are incorporated separately as Ivdelsky Urban Okrug.

References

Notes

Sources

Urban-type settlements in Sverdlovsk Oblast